Cruex is the trade name for drugs used to treat skin infections. The active ingredient is either

 Miconazole nitrate, or
 Undecylenic acid (full trade name: Cruex Prescription Strength)